Backe is a surname. Notable people with the surname include:

Brandon Backe (born 1978), American professional baseball pitcher
Hasse Backe (born 1952), Swedish footballer and manager
Herbert Backe (1896–1947), German Nazi politician
Rutger Backe (born 1951), Swedish footballer and manager (Varbergs BoIS)